The Societe d'Histoire de la Guadeloupe (Guadeloupe Historical Society) is a French society for the study of the history of Guadeloupe, the French Antilles and the wider Caribbean basin. It was founded in 1963 and publishes a scholarly journal titled Bulletin de la Société d'Histoire de la Guadeloupe.

References 

Organizations established in 1963
History of Guadeloupe
Historical societies
Organizations based in Guadeloupe
1963 establishments in Guadeloupe